The 2019–20 Serie A (known as the Serie A TIM for sponsorship reasons) was the 118th season of top-tier Italian football, the 88th in a round-robin tournament, and the 10th since its organization under an own league committee, the Lega Serie A. Juventus were the eight-time defending champions and they successfully defended their title following a 2–0 win against Sampdoria on 26 July 2020.

The season was originally scheduled to run from 24 August 2019 to 24 May 2020. However, on 9 March 2020, the Italian government halted the league until 3 April 2020 due to the COVID-19 pandemic in Italy. Serie A did not resume play on this date, citing it would only resume once "health conditions allow it". On 18 May, it was announced that Italian football would be suspended until 14 June. On 28 May, it was announced that Serie A would resume starting 20 June.

Events
On 14 April 2019, Chievo returned to Serie B after 11 years. Following this on 5 May Frosinone was relegated after one year while the last team to be relegated was Empoli (on 26 May 2019) also after just one year.

Teams that were promoted directly from 2018–19 Serie B were Brescia (on 1 May 2019, after 8 years of absence) and Lecce (10 days later, after 7 years) while the last team to join was Hellas Verona (after just one season in Serie B) by winning the promotion play-off on 2 June.

On 28 June 2019, Milan were excluded from the Europa League after breaches of the UEFA Financial Fair Play Regulations. Roma were then moved to the Europa League group phase while Torino entered the preliminary round.

Impact of the COVID-19 pandemic on Serie A
On 22 February 2020, Prime Minister of Italy, Giuseppe Conte, suspended all sporting events in the regions of Lombardy and Veneto, which included three Serie A matches in those regions, as well as one in Piedmont, that were to be played the following day, due to the COVID-19 pandemic in the country. The following week, six matches were initially to be played behind closed doors due to scare of the outbreak, however, all were later outright suspended. On 4 March, the government ruled that all sporting events in Italy would be played behind closed doors until 3 April. On 9 March, the government ruled that all sporting events in Italy be suspended until 3 April. Serie A did not resume play on this date, citing it will only resume once "health conditions allow it". On 13 May, it was announced that team training would be resumed on 18 May, and on 18 May it was announced that Italian football would be suspended until 14 June. On 28 May, Italian Minister for Sport Vincenzo Spadafora announced that Serie A would resume starting 20 June. Protocol was established wherein the entire squad would be quarantined for 14 days if one member, player or staff, tests positive for COVID-19. On 18 June, Spadafora approved the softening of quarantine rules which allowed for the quarantining of only the individual who tests positive for COVID-19, whereas the rest of the squad will ramp up testing, including a rapid-response test the day before a match.

Teams

Stadiums and locations

Personnel and kits

Managerial changes

League table

Results

Players' awards

MVP of the Month

Seasonal awards

Season statistics

Top goalscorers

Hat-tricks

Note
(H) – Home  (A) – Away

Clean sheets

Notes

Footnotes

References

External links

Official website
Serie A at ESPN.com

Serie A seasons
Italy
1
Serie A